Monadenia is a genus of air-breathing land snails in the subfamily Monadeniinae. 

These pulmonate, terrestrial molluscs belong to the gastropod class.

Snails in this genus create and use love darts as part of their mating behavior.

Species
Species within the genus Monadenia include:
 † Monadenia antecedens (Stearns, 1900) 
 Monadenia callipeplus S.S. Berry, 1940
 Monadenia chaceana S.S. Berry, 1940
 Monadenia churchi Hanna & A.G. Smith, 1933
 Monadenia circumcarinata (Stearns, 1879) - keeled sideband
 Monadenia cristulata S.S. Berry, 1940
 † Monadenia dubiosa (Stearns, 1902) 
 Monadenia fidelis (J. E. Gray, 1834)
 Monadenia infumata (Gould, 1855)
 † Monadenia marginicola (Conrad, 1871) 
 Monadenia mariposa A.G. Smith, 1957
 Monadenia marmarotis S.S. Berry, 1940
 Monadenia mormonum (L. Pfeiffer, 1857)
 Monadenia tuolumneana S.S. Berry, 1955
 Monadenia yosemitensis (H.N. Lowe, 1916)
 Species brought into synonymy
 Monadenia rotifer S. S. Berry, 1940: synonym of Monadenia marmarotis S.S. Berry, 1940
 Monadenia semialba Henderson, 1929: synonym of Monadenia fidelis fidelis (Gray, 1834)
 Monadenia setosaTalmadge, 1952 - Trinity bristle snail: synonym of Monadenia infumata setosa Talmadge, 1952
 Monadenia troglodytes  Hanna & A.G. Smith, 1933  - shasta sideband: synonym of Monadenia troglodytes troglodytes Hanna & A.G. Smith, 1933

References

 Bank, R. A. (2017). Classification of the Recent terrestrial Gastropoda of the World. Last update: July 16, 2017

External links 

 
Monadeniidae
Taxonomy articles created by Polbot